Jaulny is a commune in the Meurthe-et-Moselle department in north-eastern France.

Geography
The village lies in the middle of the commune, on the right bank of the Rupt de Mad, which flows northward through the commune.

See also
Communes of the Meurthe-et-Moselle department
Parc naturel régional de Lorraine

References

Communes of Meurthe-et-Moselle